
1910s – 1920s – 1930s – 1940s – 1950s – 1960s – 1970s – 1980s – 1990s – 2000s

1910s
1919

1919
CS Mindelense was the first football (soccer) club to be founded in Cape Verde

1920s
1922 – 1923 – 1929

1922
Mindelense became the first registered football and sports club in Cape Verde

1923
GS Castilho football (soccer) club established on the island of São Vicente
Sporting Clube da Praia football (soccer) club established, the first on the island of Santiago

1929
FC Derby football club established
Sporting Praia became a registered football club

1930s
1930 – 1931 – 1932 – 1933 – 1934 – 1935 – 1936 – 1937 – 1938 – 1939

1930
CD Travadores football club established

1931
Vitória FC football club of Praia established

1936
GD Amarantes football club of Mindelo established

1938
CS Mindelense won their first title for São Vicente after defeating Derby

1939
SC Santa Maria football club established, the first on Sal Island
Boavista Praia football club established
Mindelense won their second consecutive title for São Vicente after defeating Derby

1940s
1940 – 1941 – 1942 – 1943 – 1944 – 1945 – 1946 – 1947 – 1948 – 1949

1940
Académica do Mindelo football club established
Mindelense won their third consecutive title for São Vicente

1941
Mindelense won their fourth consecutive title for São Vicente

1942
Mindelense won their fifth consecutive title for São Vicente

1943
Mindelense won their sixth consecutive title for São Vicente

1944
GD Amarantes won their first tile for São Vicente

1945
SC Verdun football club of Pedra de Lume, Sal founded
GD Amarantes won their second consecutive title for São Viente

1946
Mindelense won their seventh title for São Vicente

1947
Mindelense won their eighth title for São Vicente eand their second consecutive

1948
Os Garridos football club of São Domingos on Santiago Island founded, the first outside of Praia
Académica do Mindelo won their first title for São Vicente

1949
Mindelense won their ninth title for São Vicente

1950s
1950 – 1951 – 1952 – 1953 – 1954 – 1955 – 1956 – 1957

1950
Mindelense won their tenth title for São Vicente and their second consecutive

1951
Mindelense won their eleventh title for São Vicente and their third consecutive

1952
Sport Sal Rei Club football club founded, the first on the island of Boa Vista
Mindelense won their twelfth title for São Vicente and their fourth consecutive title

1953
The first Cape Verdean colonial championships took place, Académica do Mindelo was the first champion
Vulcânicos, Fogo Island's first football club established

1954
Mindelense won their first colonial championship title for Cape Verde

1955
No colonial championships took place

1956
Sporting Clube da Boa Vista football club established
Sporting Clube do Porto Novo football club established
Mindelense won their second consecutive colonial championship title for Cape Verde

1957
No colonial championships for the next three years

1960s
1960 – 1961 – 1962 – 1963 – 1964 – 1965 – 1966 – 1967 – 1968 – 1969

1960
Falcões do Norte football club based in Mindelo established
Mindelense won their third consecutive colonial championship title for Cape Verde

1961
Sporting Clube da Praia won their first colonial championship title for Cape Verde

1962
Académica da Praia football club founded
Mindelense won their fourth colonial championship title for Cape Verde
Juventude football club of Morro Curral, Espargos, Sal established
Associação Académica do Fogo, a football (soccer) club established

1963
Académica do Sal football club established
Boavista Praia won their only colonial championship title for Cape Verde

1964
Académica do Mindelo won their second colonial championship title for Cape Verde

1965
Académica da Praia won their only colonial championship title for Cape Verde

1966
Mindelense won their fifth colonial championship title in Cape Verde, became the only Cape Verdean club to qualify into the Portuguese Cup later in the year
São Lourenço FC, based in João Teves founded
FC Ultramarina football club based in Tarrafal de São Nicolau founded
Académico do Aeroporto do Sal football club established

1967
Académica do Mindelo won their last colonial championship title for Cape Verde

1968
Académica Praia defeated Os Garridos 21-0 which made it the highest scoring match in any of the regional championships to date
Mindelense won their sixth colonial championship title for Cape Verde
Botafogo, a football (soccer) club based in São Filipe, Fogo established
AD Bairro football club founded in Praia, the first to be based in a neighborhood

1969
Sporting Praia won their last colonial championship title for Cape Verde

1970s
1970 – 1971 – 1972 – 1973 – 1974 – 1975 – 1976 – 1977 – 1978 – 1979

1970
No colonial championships took place that season

1971
Mindelense won their last colonial championship title for Cape Verde, it was also the last club to compete in the 1971 Portuguese Cup

1972
CD Travadores won their first colonial championship title for Cape Verde
Celtic da Praia football club founded

1973
GS Castilho won their only colonial championship title for Cape Verde

1974
Travadores was the last colonial champion of Cape Verde

1975
Regional championships occurred, no two winners would elevate into the championship match as it was cancelled
Cape Verde declared independence from Portugal

1976
Fogo Island League championships established
Onze Estrelas football (soccer) club based in Boa Vista established
África Show football (soccer) club based in Rabil on Boa Vista Island founded
Onze Unidos football club based in Maio founded
CS Mindelense won their first national championship title for Cape Verde

1977
Barreirense football club based in Barreiro, Maio founded
Mindelense won their second consecutive championship title for Cape Verde
SC Atlético football club based in Ribeira Brava, São Nicolau founded

1978
Boa Vista Island League established
Beira-Mar football club based in Maio established
No national championship competition held due to that the winner of the Sotavento Islands was undecided to challenge Mindelense, the winner of the Barlavento Islands

1979
Desportivo da Praia football club founded
Académica da Calheta do Maio football club founded
No national championship competition held

1980s
1980 – 1981 – 1982 – 1983 – 1984 – 1985 – 1986 – 1987 – 1988 – 1989

1980
SC Morabeza football club based in Brava founded
Botafogo won their only national championship title

1981
Académica do Porto Novo football club founded
Batuque FC football club from Mindelo founded
Mindelense won their third national championship title
CS Marítimo do Porto Novo football club established
Paulense Desportivo Clube of Santo Antão founded

1982
No national championship competitions took place

1983
Cutelinho a football (soccer) club established
Académico Sal Rei (now Académica e Operária) won their only national championship title
Académico 83 do Porto Inglês football club founded

1984
Tchadense football club established in Praia
FC Esperança football club established, since 1996, it is known as Os Sanjoanenses based in Ribeira da Prata
Derby FC won their first national championship title

1985
Santiago Island Cup founded, the first to be established in Cape Verde
Sporting Praia won their first national championship title
SC Beira-Mar do Tarrafal football club founded
GD Varanda football club of Praia founded

1986
No national championship competition took place

1987
Boavista Praia won their first national championship title
Corinthians São Vicente football club based in Mindelo established

1988
Sporting Clube da Brava football club founded
Mindelense won their fourth national championship title

1989
Académica do Mindelo won their only national championship title

1990s
1990 – 1991 – 1992 – 1993 – 1994 – 1995 – 1996 – 1997 – 1998 – 1999

1990
Desportivo de Assomada football club founded
Mindelense won their fifth national championship title
Solpontense FC in Santo Antão founded

1991
Sporting Praia won their second national championship title
São Vicente Regional Championships were not held for the season

1992
Estadio Fontinha becomes Estádio Municipal Adérito Sena in Mindelo
Mindelense won their sixth national championship title

1993
Académica do Sal won their only national championship title

1994
Varandinha of Tarrafal, Santiago's football club founded
GDRC Fiorentina do Porto Novo football club established
Travadores won their first national championship title

1995
Fogo Regional Championships interrupted due to the 1995 eruption of Pico do Fogo
Amabox Barceona of Tarrafal, Santiago's football club founded
Boavista Praia won their second national championship title

1996
Travadores won their second and recent national championship title for the club

1997
Porto Novo Cup held it sfirst edition
Sporting Praia won their third national championship title

1998
FC Praia Branca football club from São Nicolau founded
Mindelense won their seventh national championship title

1999
The Santiago Regional Championships and its cup competition were cancelled for the season
Sal Island Cup held its first edition
GD Amarantes won their only national championship title

2000s
2000 – 2001 – 2002 – 2003 – 2004 – 2005 – 2006 – 2007 – 2008 – 2009

2000
Maio and Brava Regional Championships were cancelled due to shortage of money
FC Derby win their second national championship title
Sal Island SuperCup held its first edition

2001
Santiago Regional Championships season were not held
Grémio Nhágar football club founded
Sal Island Opening Tournament held its first edition
The São Nicolau Cup, the Super Cup and the Opening Tournament held their first editions
The  São Vicente Cup and Super Cup held their first editions
Onze Unidos won their only national championship title

2002
Spartak d'Aguadinha football club based on the island of Fogo founded
Sporting Praia won their fourth national championship title

2003
AJAT'SN football soccer club from São Nicolau established
Scorpion Vermelho football club based in Pedra Badejo founded
Estádio Marcelo Leitão opened in Espargos
Académico do Aeroporto do Sal won their only national championship title

2004
The Santo Antão South Zone season was cancelled
GD Corôa football (soccer) club based in Brava established
Sport Sal Rei Club won their only national championship title

2005
Sporting Praia made their highest point totals of any regional championships with 49 points made for the Santiago South Premier Division, the national record stood for nearly eleven years
FC Derby won their third and recent national championship title for the club
Not long after the end of the 2005 São Nicolau season, the association and the federation knew that FC Ultramarina and SC Atlético were fielding ineligible players in every match, all of their points were stripped and became placed 6th and last, this was the only time in West Africa that was done
Sporting Praia defeated Estância Baixo 13-0 which made the highest scoring championship match to date
CD São Pedro Apóstolo football club from Santo Antão established

2006
Santiago North Zone Regional Championships season were not held
Sporting Praia won their fifth national championship title

2007
Sporting Praia won their sixth national championship title
Académica Praia won their only national cup title for Cape Verde

2008
Estadio Municipal Arsénio Ramos in Sal Rei, Boa Vista opened
Sporting Praia won their seventh national championship title
As the National Championships continued into another month having its knockout stage matches rescheduled, the national cup competitions were cancelled

2009
Boa Vista Island Cup held its first edition
Valência football (soccer) club established
Sporting Praia won their eighth national championship title
Boavista Praia won their first national cup title for Cape Verde

2010s
2010 – 2011 – 2012 – 2013 – 2014 – 2015 – 2016 – 2017

2010
São Vicente Association Cup cancelled
Juventude da Furna football (soccer) club established
Boavista Praia won their recent national championship title and later their second and recent national cup title for Cape Verde
Clubs based in the municipality of São Domingos switched from the North to the South Zone of Santiago, the only club listed Garridos would compete in the South Zone's Second Division.

2011
Brava football (soccer) competitions were not held
Santo Antão South Zone Cup were cancelled, its Super Cup were cancelled for two seasons due to a smaller club withdrawal
Onze Estrelas participated in the Boa Vista Island League for the first time
Mindelense won their eighth national championship title
No national cup competition took place

2012
Complexo Desportivo Adega completed, it would be used for training grounds of Sporting and Boavista Praia
Sporting Praia won their eighth and recent national championship title for the club
Onze Unidos won their only national cup title

2013
São Vicente Association Cup cancelled for the next two seasons
Midelense won their ninth national championship title
No further Cape Verdean Cup editions took place due to financial and scheduling problems
Sporting Praia won their only national super cup title

2014
Mindelense won their tenth national championship title
The Fogo Regional Premier Division was interrupted from November 23 to December 20 due to the eruption of Pico do Fogo, the Fogo Regional Cup was also cancelled, it probably cancelled the 2013-14 Santiago South Zone Cup on the adjacent island.

2015
Parque Real directly relegated into the Fogo Second Division, the club concede the most goals in history numbering over 100
Mindelense won their eleventh national championship title
The Santo Antão Super Cup held its first edition and the next single island competition within divided association in eight years

2016
The first Santo Antão Cup took place
Académica do Porto Novo made a 60 match unbeaten streak which began in 2011 and ended on April 23, it became the longest unbeaten record in Cape Verde
Varandina (63 points) and Scorpion Vermelho (61 points) of the Santiago North Premier Division made their national record point total of any regional championships for the season exceeding Sporting Praia's 49 points made in 2005
Mindelense won their twelfth and recent national championship title

2017
The 2016-17 Santiago North Zone championships (Premier and Second) for the second week of February which were suspended for two weeks due to that the referees needed the salaries for the 17th and the 26th rounds last season and the rounds of the season.
Derby made a protest in April that Académica do Mindelo was using a goalkeeper with a fake identity. On April 24, the Disciplinary Council of the Cape Verdean Football Federation, removed every points that the fake goalkeeper had played totalling 11 which was 5 matches. Also their positions were dropped from first to fifth and also, their National qualification was stripped.
Benfica Santa Cruz and some other clubs protested AJAC's round 16 win over Juventus Assomada where AJAC fielded a suspended player, Marco Aurélio, who had received two yellow cards.  After the end of the season of the, Santiago North Premier Division, it went into uncertainty until May 11 as  the Judicial Council made it official, Benfica de Santa Cruz were crowned Premier Division champions of the North Zone while AJAC was punished and was officially relegated.
Mindelense was disqualified from further playoff participation in the semis after the first leg match was not held due to that access to Estádio Orlando Rodrigues was locked as no keys were available, the match was later rescheduled, after Ultramarina appealed, the first leg was planned but was later removed, the second leg which was at Mindelo took place
Sporting Praia won their 10th and recent national championship title

See also
Timeline of association football

References

Football in Cape Verde
Capeverdean Football
Football